Hesketh is a hamlet in southern Alberta, Canada within Kneehill County.

The community has the name of J. A. Hesketh, a railroad official.

Demographics 

See also 
List of communities in Alberta
List of designated places in Alberta
List of hamlets in Alberta

References 

Hamlets in Alberta
Designated places in Alberta
Kneehill County